Hundar is a village in the Leh district of Ladakh, India, famous for sand dunes and Bactrian camels. It is located in the Nubra tehsil, on the banks of the Shyok River. The Hunder Monastery is located here.

Hundar was once the capital of the former Nubra kingdom. There are several ruined buildings, including the ruins of the king's palace, the Langchen Khar ("Elephant Palace"). There is a fort at the top of the hill, called Gula. Hundar also has two Buddhist temples: the white temple (Lhakhang Karpo) and the red temple (Lhakhang Marpo). Between Hundar and Diskit lie sand dunes.

Demographics
According to the 2011 census of India, Hundar has 269 households. The effective literacy rate (i.e. the literacy rate of population excluding children aged 6 and below) is 60.65%.

References

Villages in Nubra tehsil